Mykola Kut (Kutniakhov) was born on 16 April, 1952 in Luhansk (Ukraine)

Lives and works in Kyiv (Ukraine)

In 1965 he met Illya Ovcharenko, the sculptor who introduced him to the world of visual art.

In 1967 he graduated from art school and became a student of Luhansk Art College. He successfully graduated with an honor (Red Diploma).

In 1974, after the military service, he started his studying in Kyiv State Art Institute, now the National Academy of Fine Arts and Architecture.

He studied in the monumental painting workshop. It was founded by the famous monumentalist Mykhailo Boychuk — a Ukrainian teacher and friend of a Mexican monumentalist painter Diego Rivera, whose traditions and heritage Mykola Kut followed at an early stage of his work.

Since 1979 he is an active member of national and international exhibitions.

In 1989 becomes a Member of the National Artist Union of Ukraine

Mykola Kut's art is versatile, it contains monumental works made in different techniques — smalt mosaics, stained glass, encaustic, murals, portraits, iconography, multi-figured compositions

His easel and monumental works are in museums and private collections, they also decorate city squares and architectural facades in Ukraine and abroad.

Since 1989 he creates his unique personal style. Inspired by nature and landscape space, Mykola Kut creates monumental spatial paintings. Their distinctive features are compositional perfection and original coloring. Today Mykola Kut is one of the few artists in modern Ukraine who work with the landscape theme specifically in large formats, having developed his own personal style distinguished by many Ukrainian art historians as unique and having no analogs in the history of classical and contemporary art.

Mykola Kut's every single sketch at an early stage has a perfect generalization, which allows later to enlarge etude pictures to much larger formats, either non-standard canvas or architectural building walls.

In 2001 he accepted an offer from the Kyiv Dnipro district to head the Kyiv Art School №6  He still holds the position of honorary director and combines all kinds of art and aesthetic education for Kyiv youth.

Mykola Kut is a winner of many national and art awards:

The Kyiv mayor “Honor Sign» — 2003 and 2007

Two “George the Victorious” orders of I and II degrees from the Kyiv Patriarchate Ukrainian Orthodox Church in 2012

Honor of the Parliament of Ukraine of III degree, 2015

Laureate of the Kyiv Artist Union of Ukraine «ARTIST», nomination: best monumental work in 2015

Honorary Doctor of Fine Arts — Academy of Sciences and Arts «Union» S Korolev (Russia) since 2013

References

2. Mykola Kut's works in on-line gallery Artmajeur.  http://www.artmajeur.com/en/art-gallery/gallery/mykola-kut/1633636

3. Mykola Kut's works in on-line gallery Rippingham Art https://theartonlinegallery.com/artist/mykolakut/

1952 births
Living people
Ukrainian artists